The 2002 College Nationals was the 7th Women's College Nationals.  The College Nationals was a team handball tournament to determined the College National Champion from 2002 from the US.

Venues
The championship was played at the Furman University in Greenville, South Carolina.

Modus

The three teams played a round roubin.

Results
Source:

Group stage

Final ranking
Source:

Awards
Source:

Top scorers

Source:

All-Tournament Team
Source:

References

External links
 Tournament Results archived

USA Team Handball College Nationals by year
Furman Paladins